Oakesdale is a town in Whitman County, Washington, United States. The population was 422 at the 2010 census.

History
Oakesdale was first settled in 1876 by James McCoy. The community was named after Thomas F. Oakes, a railroad official. Oakesdale was incorporated in 1890.

Notable natives
 Virgil T. McCroskey, creator of Steptoe Butte State Park and McCroskey State Park

Geography
Oakesdale is located at  (47.130573, -117.244359).

Demographics

2010 census
As of the census of 2010, there were 422 people, 166 households, and 123 families living in the town. The racial makeup of the town was 97.2% White, 0.5% Asian, 0.5% from other races, and 1.9% from two or more races. Hispanic or Latino of any race were 0.9% of the population.

There were 166 households, of which 32.5% had children under the age of 18 living with them, 60.8% were married couples living together, 6.6% had a female householder with no husband present, 6.6% had a male householder with no wife present, and 25.9% were non-families. 19.9% of all households were made up of individuals, and 10.8% had someone living alone who was 65 years of age or older. The average household size was 2.54 and the average family size was 2.90.

The median age in the town was 44.4 years. 25.1% of residents were under the age of 18; 6.4% were between the ages of 18 and 24; 19.6% were from 25 to 44; 30.3% were from 45 to 64; and 18.5% were 65 years of age or older. The gender makeup of the town was 47.6% male and 52.4% female.

2000 census
As of the census of 2000, there were 420 people, 172 households, and 127 families living in the town. The population density was 404.2 people per square mile (155.9/km2). There were 194 housing units at an average density of 186.7 per square mile (72.0/km2). The racial makeup of the town was 98.33% White, 0.24% Asian, 0.95% from other races, and 0.48% from two or more races. Hispanic or Latino of any race were 0.95% of the population.

There were 172 households, out of which 34.3% had children under the age of 18 living with them, 64.5% were married couples living together, 7.6% had a female householder with no husband present, and 25.6% were non-families. 23.8% of all households were made up of individuals, and 14.5% had someone living alone who was 65 years of age or older. The average household size was 2.44 and the average family size was 2.88.

In the town, the age distribution of the population shows 25.7% under the age of 18, 3.8% from 18 to 24, 25.2% from 25 to 44, 26.7% from 45 to 64, and 18.6% who were 65 years of age or older. The median age was 43 years. For every 100 females, there were 97.2 males. For every 100 females age 18 and over, there were 91.4 males.

The median income for a household in the town was $31,094, and the median income for a family was $42,813. Males had a median income of $27,500 versus $30,714 for females. The per capita income for the town was $16,159. About 9.0% of families and 11.7% of the population were below the poverty line, including 21.2% of those under age 18 and 4.3% of those age 65 or over.

See also

 List of towns in Washington (state)

References

External links

 The Boomerang! - Local newspaper

Towns in Washington (state)
Towns in Whitman County, Washington
1890 establishments in Washington (state)